Functional generative description (FGD) is a linguistic framework developed at Charles University in Prague since the 1960s by a team led by Petr Sgall. Based on the dependency grammar formalism, it is a stratificational grammar formalism that treats the sentence as a system of interlinked layers: phonological, morphematical, morphonological, analytical (surface syntax) and tectogrammatical (deep syntax). Continuing the tradition of Prague School, special attention is paid to the phenomenon of topic–focus articulation.

The Prague Dependency Treebank (PDT) is a treebank consisting of a subset of the Czech National Corpus annotated along the lines of FGD.

References 
 Sgall, P., Hajičová, E., Panevová, J. (1986). The Meaning of the Sentence in Its Semantic and Pragmatic Aspects. Dordrecht: D. Reidel Publishing Company. .

External links 
 Prague Dependency Treebank 2.0
 Prague Dependency Treebank 2.5

Prague linguistic circle
Semantics
Dependency grammar